Association Sportive Sud-Est (or simply AS Sud-Est or ASSE) is a professional football club based in Sud-Est, Haiti. The club was the 2016 Division 2 Championship (Championnat d'Ascension), and quickly elevated to Division 1 in less than two years since its founding. Former Senator, Senator Edwin (Edo) Zenny is honorary President.

History
The Association Sportive Sud-Est was founded on 28 February 2015. It won the Division 2 and was promoted to Division 1 after the 2016 season. Its first match in D1 came against América des Cayes, where the match ended in a 1–1 draw. Its first win in the top division came against Tempête FC on 18 March 2017 ending the match 0–3.

References

Football clubs in Haiti
Association football clubs established in 2015
2015 establishments in Haiti
Sud-Est (department)